The men's 1000 meter at the 2010 KNSB Dutch Single Distance Championships took place in Heerenveen at the Thialf ice skating rink on Saturday 31 October 2009. Although this tournament was held in 2009 it was part of the speed skating season 2009–2010. There were 24 participants.

Statistics

Result

Source:

Draw

References

Single Distance Championships
2010 Single Distance